Andriy Volodymyrovych Proshyn (or Andrei Vladimirovich Proshin) (born 19 February 1985) is a Ukrainian professional football coach and a former player. He is the manager of FC Kosmos Dolgoprudny. He also holds Russian citizenship.

Club career
He made his debut in the Russian Premier League in 2006 for FC Tom Tomsk.

See also
 2005 FIFA World Youth Championship squads#Ukraine

References

1985 births
Living people
People from Bor, Nizhny Novgorod Oblast
Russian footballers
Ukrainian footballers
Association football midfielders
Association football defenders
Ukraine under-21 international footballers
Ukrainian expatriate footballers
Expatriate footballers in Russia
FC Khimki players
FC Tom Tomsk players
FC Spartak Vladikavkaz players
Russian Premier League players
FC Rostov players
FC Volga Nizhny Novgorod players
Ukrainian football managers
FC Sibir Novosibirsk players
FC Khimik Dzerzhinsk players
FC Olimp-Dolgoprudny players
Sportspeople from Nizhny Novgorod Oblast